20th & Welton station (sometimes styled as 20th•Welton) is an island platformed RTD light rail station in Denver, Colorado, United States. Originally operating as part of the D Line, the station was opened on October 8, 1994, and is operated by the Regional Transportation District. It is the southernmost station on the Five Points branch. The January 14, 2018 service changes introduced the L Line, which now serves this station in place of the D Line.

References

RTD light rail stations in Denver
Railway stations in the United States opened in 1994